Erhan Güven (born 15 May 1982) is a Turkish former football defender.

Honours
Beşiktaş JK
Turkish Cup : 2010-11

External links

1982 births
Living people
Turkish footballers
Turkey B international footballers
Beşiktaş J.K. footballers
Gençlerbirliği S.K. footballers
Ankaraspor footballers
Mersin İdman Yurdu footballers
Sivasspor footballers
Kayseri Erciyesspor footballers
Süper Lig players

Association football defenders